John Solomon "Sol" Rosevear (4 January 189221 March 1953) was an Australian politician, and was Speaker of the Australian House of Representatives from 1943 to 1949.

Early life
Rosevear was born on 4 January 1892 in Pyrmont, Sydney, New South Wales. He was the seventh child of Maria (née McGuirk) and William John Rosevear. His father was a carter. Rosevear attended the local public school before beginning work in the timber industry, where he became known as a skilled tradesman. He married Clara May White on 23 September 1916, with whom he had two children.

Rosevear became involved in the labour movement at a young age as a member of the Timber Workers' Union. He was active in the Leichhardt branch of the ALP and served as president of the electorate council for Dalley. He managed Ted Theodore's campaign at the 1929 federal election. In the same year, Rosevear played an active role in a big strike within the timber industry. He lost his job and led the Leichhardt Unemployed Workers' Relief Movement during the Great Depression. He registered for the dole, and was due to receive his first payment on the day he was elected to federal parliament.

Politics

Rosevear was an Australian Labor Party official and organised Ted Theodore's campaign in 1929. After the 1931 Labor split, however, Rosevear joined the Lang Labor breakaway and defeated Theodore in his seat of Dalley in the election of that year. He sat in the House of Representatives under the leadership of Jack Beasley until 1936, when the two factions reunited. Following the second split of 1940, Rosevear was deputy-leader of the Australian Labor Party (Non-Communist).

In 1941, John Curtin reunited the Labor Party and Rosevear rejoined the ALP. In July 1942, under special wartime circumstances, he was appointed Controller of Footwear and Leather Supplies within the Department of Supply and Development. By ministerial decree in November 1942, he was given the power to regulate the manufacture of footwear and materials for the manufacture of footwear.

Speaker of the House
Rosevear was disappointed not to receive a cabinet post, but was appointed Speaker of the House of Representatives on 22 June 1943. He gained a reputation as an inflexible Speaker, accused by the media and the Opposition of partisanship; journalist E.H. Cox claimed that he was "frequently drunk in the Chair". Rosevear also permitted illegal gambling in the Chamber, and participated himself.

Rosevear continued to be influential in caucus, and it was rumoured that he hoped to succeed Ben Chifley as party leader, but his "taste for grog" was seen as a disqualification by some. In the 1949 election the Chifley government was defeated by the Liberal/Country Party coalition led by Prime Minister Robert Menzies and Rosevear lost the Speakership. He was survived by his wife, a son and a daughter. A portrait of Rosevear by Joshua Smith won the Archibald Prize in 1944.

References

 

1892 births
1953 deaths
Australian Labor Party members of the Parliament of Australia
Lang Labor members of the Parliament of Australia
Members of the Australian House of Representatives
Members of the Australian House of Representatives for Dalley
Speakers of the Australian House of Representatives
20th-century Australian politicians